Village of the Damned: Welcome to Dryden is a short American documentary television series on Investigation Discovery that debuted on November 28, 2017. The series examines the tragic events that took place in the small village of Dryden from 1989 until 1996.

Episodes

Season 1 (2017)

References

2010s American documentary television series
2017 American television series debuts
English-language television shows
Investigation Discovery original programming
2017 American television series endings